The Giants is a 1974 album featuring Oscar Peterson, Joe Pass, and Ray Brown. At the Grammy Awards of 1978, Peterson won the Grammy Award for Best Jazz Performance by a Soloist for his performance on this album. It was reissued on CD in 1995 by Original Jazz Classics.

Track listing
 "Riff Blues" (Oscar Peterson) – 4:24
 "Who Cares?" (George Gershwin, Ira Gershwin) – 6:29
 "Jobim" (Joe Pass, Peterson) – 6:29
 "Blues for Dennis" (Peterson) – 5:31
 "Sunny" (Bobby Hebb) – 4:49
 "I'm Getting Sentimental Over You" (George Bassman, Ned Washington) – 7:22
 "Caravan" (Duke Ellington, Irving Mills, Juan Tizol) – 6:34
 "Eyes of Love" (Quincy Jones, Bob Russell) – 6:53

Personnel
 Oscar Peterson – piano & organ
 Joe Pass – guitar
 Ray Brown - double bass

Chart positions

References

1974 albums
Oscar Peterson albums
Joe Pass albums
Ray Brown (musician) albums
Pablo Records albums
Albums produced by Norman Granz